Domingos Mendes (born 10 August 1961) is a Mozambican hurdler. He competed in the men's 400 metres hurdles at the 1984 Summer Olympics.

References

External links
 

1961 births
Living people
Athletes (track and field) at the 1984 Summer Olympics
Mozambican male hurdlers
Olympic athletes of Mozambique
Place of birth missing (living people)